Taylor Walker (born 25 April 1990) is a professional Australian rules footballer who plays for the Adelaide Football Club in the Australian Football League (AFL). He is a former NSW Scholarship player with the club, and was drafted with pick 75 in the 2007 national draft. Walker previously captained Adelaide from 2015 to 2019. In September 2020, he kicked his 441st goal to become Adelaide's leading goalkicker.

Early life
Walker attended Willyama High School in Broken Hill. His father, Wayne, was a prominent footballer in Broken Hill who played more than 350 games. In 2006, Walker accepted a NSW Scholarship contract with Adelaide at the age of 16. However, he continued to play for his senior local amateur league team, North Broken Hill, in the Broken Hill Football League, leading them to the 2007 premiership with a seven-goal, best-on-ground performance, playing at centre half-forward.

Football career

Early career (2008–2011) 
He made his AFL debut in round 1 the next season, against , and held his place in the side for the next 12 rounds. This included a five-goal performance against reigning premiers  in round 10, which earned him an AFL Rising Star nomination. However, only three weeks later he was dropped from the senior side and played just one more match for the season, with coach Neil Craig wanting him to work on deficiencies in his game.

Walker returned to the side in 2010 and showed fluctuating form, showing glimpses of brilliance alongside some poor performances. He was dropped from the side on a number of occasions throughout the year, sparking rumours that he and head coach Neil Craig were not seeing eye to eye and that Craig was using Walker as a scapegoat for Adelaide's poor form throughout the year. Again, Walker was accused of not showing enough defensive pressure in the forward line. He finished with 35 goals for the season from 18 games, including two sets of 4 goals against  and then .

Early in 2011, Walker was dropped once again and was seen drinking a beer on live television at a SANFL game, sparking speculation that he 'didn't care' and may have signed a contract with incoming expansion team , with whom Walker had been previously strongly linked. However, late in the season, Walker re-signed with the Crows for a further four years. Despite inconsistent form and injuries, Walker was the club's leading goalkicker in 2011, booting 32 goals from only 13 games, at an average of 2.5 per game, ranked sixth in the AFL.

Improvement (2012–2014)

In 2012, Walker improved under new coach Brenton Sanderson. As of round 8, Walker led the Coleman Medal count before two separate suspensions for rough tackles cost him the chance to lead the league's goalscoring. In total, Walker kicked 63 goals for the season and 3.3 per game, second in the AFL behind Lance Franklin.

In round 5, 2013, against , Walker hyper-extended his right knee and suffered an anterior cruciate ligament injury requiring a full reconstruction and 12-month rehabilitation period. In the meantime, Walker made headlines by appearing on The Footy Show and agreeing to shave his famous mullet to raise money for the Leukaemia Foundation. He then went on to raise a total of $66,672.45 for the foundation before having his head shaved by TV personality and former  player Sam Newman.

He finished with 34 goals in 15 games, and averaged a career-high 14.7 disposals per game. In November, Walker extended his contract with the Crows for three further years, until the end of 2018.

Captaincy (2015–2019)

In January 2015, Walker was appointed captain of Adelaide. He returned to his best form in that year, finishing fourth in the Coleman Medal with 55 goals in the home-and-away season and leading the club inspirationally as they overcame the death of senior coach Phil Walsh to make the semi-finals. He played his 100th AFL game in round 18 against the Sydney Swans at the Sydney Cricket Ground, fittingly in his home state of New South Wales.

In 2016, he was voted the AFL Player's Association captain of the year.

Walker went into his third season as captain with a full pre-season of training, but when the season began there were concerns that a hamstring strain suffered in a JLT Series match against  could rule him out of the Crows’ first match against . He worked hard to recover, going to extra training sessions in the week leading up to the match, but was ultimately left out of the team. He returned in the second round against . Walker began the season with great form, starring with five goals and four goal assists in the first half against  in the absence of fellow key forwards Josh Jenkins and Mitch McGovern. He kicked 18 goals in his first five games while Adelaide remained undefeated, but he began to struggle, only kicking 16 in his next seven with the Crows losing five of those games. Though he was still contracted to play for the club until 2018, Walker signed a contract extension to the end of 2021. Johannisen went on to play the rest of the match, but the incident was looked at by the Match Review Panel, who charged Walker with misconduct and fined him $1,000. Walker missed the final match of the home and away season against  due to a toe injury.

Walker performed underwhelmingly and admitted that he was one of the players who didn’t play their role well enough. After the match he was criticised over the brevity of his post-match speech.

On 4 September 2019, Walker stepped down as the club's captain.

2020 season 
On 19 September 2020, Walker became the all-time leading goalkicker for the Adelaide Crows. He scored his 441st goal for the club in Round 18 of the shortened 2020 season against Richmond, surpassing Tony Modra's previous record of 440. He was also the Adelaide's leading goalkicker for the shortened 2020 season, scoring 15 goals; this was the lowest tally for any club's highest scorer since Jack James totalled 13 goals for St Kilda in the 1920 season (exactly 100 years prior).

2021 season 
Walker started the year in resurgent form, kicking 17 goals in his first three games and beating his 2020 tally in the process. He joined Jonathan Brown as the second AFL player since 1993 to kick five or more goals in each of the first three rounds of a season.

Before the round 21 Showdown match with Port Adelaide, news broke of Walker having made a racist comment about a player from an opposing team in the SANFL. After an AFL investigation, Walker was suspended for six matches and fined $20,000.

Statistics
 Statistics are correct to end of the 2022 season

|- style="background:#eaeaea;"
! scope="row" style="text-align:center" | 2009
| style="text-align:center" | 
| 13 || 14 || 23 || 19 || 88 || 22 || 110 || 57 || 25 || 1.6 || 1.4 || 6.3 || 1.6 || 7.9 || 4.1 || 1.8
|- 
! scope="row" style="text-align:center" | 2010
| style="text-align:center" | 
| 13 || 18 || 35 || 28 || 144 || 69 || 213 || 84 || 30 || 1.9 || 1.6 || 8.0 || 3.8 || 11.8 || 4.7 || 1.7
|- style="background:#eaeaea;"
! scope="row" style="text-align:center" | 2011
| style="text-align:center" | 
| 13 || 13 || 32 || 13 || 85 || 61 || 146 || 61 || 9 || 2.5 || 1.0 || 6.5 || 4.7 || 11.2 || 4.7 || 0.7
|- 
! scope="row" style="text-align:center" | 2012
| style="text-align:center" | 
| 13 || 19 || 63 || 35 || 191 || 82 || 273 || 128 || 28 || 3.3 || 1.8 || 10.1 || 4.3 || 14.4 || 6.7 || 1.5
|- style="background:#eaeaea;"
! scope="row" style="text-align:center" | 2013
| style="text-align:center" | 
| 13 || 5 || 10 || 6 || 40 || 21 || 61 || 23 || 8 || 2.0 || 1.2 || 8.0 || 4.2 || 12.2 || 4.6 || 1.6
|- 
! scope="row" style="text-align:center" | 2014
| style="text-align:center" | 
| 13 || 15 || 34 || 22 || 138 || 82 || 220 || 84 || 24 || 2.3 || 1.5 || 9.2 || 5.5 || 14.7 || 5.6 || 1.6
|- style="background:#eaeaea;"
! scope="row" style="text-align:center" | 2015
| style="text-align:center" | 
| 13 || 23 || 59 || 45 || 253 || 73 || 326 || 171 || 31 || 2.6 || 2.0 || 11.0 || 3.2 || 14.2 || 7.4 || 1.6
|- 
! scope="row" style="text-align:center" | 2016
| style="text-align:center" | 
| 13 || 23 || 47 || 37 || 235 || 97 || 332 || 97 || 34 || 2.0 || 1.6 || 10.2 || 4.2 || 14.4 || 6.7 || 1.5
|- style="background:#eaeaea;"
! scope="row" style="text-align:center" | 2017
| style="text-align:center" | 
| 13 || 23 || 54 || 35 || 237 || 105 || 342 || 146 || 44 || 2.3 || 1.5 || 10.3 || 4.6 || 14.9 || 6.3 || 1.9
|- 
! scope="row" style="text-align:center" | 2018
| style="text-align:center" | 
| 13 || 14 || 26 || 17 || 106 || 55 || 161 || 59 || 30 || 1.9 || 1.2 || 7.6 || 3.9 || 11.5 || 4.2 || 2.1
|- style="background:#eaeaea;"
! scope="row" style="text-align:center" | 2019
| style="text-align:center" | 
| 13 || 22 || 43 || 22 || 175 || 89 || 264 || 112 || 32 || 1.9 || 1.0 || 8.0 || 4.0 || 12.0 || 5.1 || 1.4
|- 
! scope="row" style="text-align:center" | 2020
| style="text-align:center" | 
| 13 || 14 || 15 || 9 || 74 || 31 || 105 || 36 || 14 || 1.1 || 0.6 || 5.3 || 2.2 || 7.5 || 2.6 || 1.0
|- style="background:#eaeaea;"
! scope="row" style="text-align:center" | 2021
| style="text-align:center" | 
| 13 || 17 || 48 || 29 || 155 || 72 || 227 || 90 || 23 || 2.8 || 1.7 || 9.1 || 4.2 || 13.3 || 5.2 || 1.3
|-
! scope="row" style="text-align:center" | 2022
| style="text-align:center" | 
| 13 || 18 || 47 || 23 || 168 || 87 || 255 || 94 || 36 || 2.6 || 1.3 || 9.3 || 4.8 || 14.2 || 5.2 || 2
|- class="sortbottom"
! colspan=3| Career
! 238
! 536
! 340
! 2088
! 946
! 3034
! 1300
! 368
! 2.3
! 1.4
! 8.8
! 4.0
! 12.7
! 5.5
! 1.5
|}

References

External links

1990 births
Living people
Adelaide Football Club players
NSW/ACT Rams players
Adelaide Football Club (SANFL) players
North Broken Hill Football Club players
Norwood Football Club players
Australian rules footballers from New South Wales
People from Broken Hill, New South Wales